Samuel Browne may refer to:

Samuel Browne (cricketer) (born 1844), Barbadian cricketer
Samuel Browne (divine) (c. 1575–1632), English minister of religion
Samuel Browne (judge) (1598–1668), English lawyer, MP for Totnes and Bedford, knight
Samuel Browne (MP for Rutland) (c. 1634–1691), his nephew, English militia commissioner and MP for Rutland
Samuel Browne (surgeon) (died 1698), English botanist

See also
Sam Browne (disambiguation)
Samuel Brown (disambiguation)
Sam Brown (disambiguation)